Damiano Schet (born 8 April 1990, in Amsterdam) is a Dutch professional footballer who plays as a winger. 

He formerly played for Haarlem, IJsselmeervogels, Rijnsburgse Boys, RKC Waalwijk, AEK Larnaca, SC Cambuur, Telstar and FC Oss.

Career

Club career
In May 2019, Schet signed a deal with GVVV in the Dutch Tweede Divisie for the 2019-20 season. However, at the end of January 2020 it was confirmed, that Schet would leave the club at the end of the season.

In August 2020, Schet joined Sportlust '46.

References

External links

1990 births
Living people
Dutch footballers
Dutch expatriate footballers
RKC Waalwijk players
AEK Larnaca FC players
SC Cambuur players
SC Telstar players
TOP Oss players
FC Den Bosch players
VV Katwijk players
GVVV players
Sportlust '46 players
Eredivisie players
Eerste Divisie players
Tweede Divisie players
Derde Divisie players
Cypriot First Division players
Footballers from Amsterdam
Association football wingers
Dutch expatriate sportspeople in Cyprus
Expatriate footballers in Cyprus